Linda M. Weiss  is an Australian professor of political science at the University of Sydney (USYD), specialising in the international and comparative politics of economic development.

Weiss is best known for questioning the converging effect associated with globalisation by pointing to the mediating role played by domestic nation-state institutions and capabilities and arguing that the effect non-state powers have upon a government can be enabling as well as constraining. Furthermore, within this argument, rather than a movement towards a neoliberal model, Weiss sees the emergence of what she calls "governed interdependence". This theory is forwarded in The Myth of the Powerless State (1998) and submitted to empirical testing in States in the Global Economy (2003).

Weiss' work is directly influenced by Michael Mann whom she worked under during her formative years.

Of additional note, How to Kill a Country (2004), authored with Thurbon and Mathews, was the first sustained critical analysis of the Australia-US Free Trade Agreement signed and ratified by both countries' governments in 2004. The authors regard the Agreement as a sub-optimal deal for Australia and in later work put forward the argument that the Australian government misread their special relationship with the US and proceeded with the Agreement for public relations reasons, particularly with regard to the issue of Australia-US relations during the 2004 Australian federal election.

Weiss was elected Fellow of the Academy of the Social Sciences in Australia in 2004.

Selected publications
Global governance, national strategies: how industrialized states make room to move under the WTO 2005
How to Kill a Country – Australia's devastating trade deal with the United States 2004 
States in the Global Economy: Bringing Domestic Institutions Back In 2003 
The Myth of the Powerless State 1998 
States and Economic Development: A Comparative Historical Analysis 1995 
Creating Capitalism 1988

References

External links
Professor Linda Weiss - USYD School of Government and International Relations webpage
Review of 'States in the Global Economy: Bringing Domestic Institutions Back In' - from International Studies Review (2004)
The Australian Interest - The Australian Interest webpage

1952 births
Living people
Australian political scientists
Women political scientists
Fellows of the Academy of the Social Sciences in Australia